Syllepte atrisquamalis is a moth in the family Crambidae. It was described by George Hampson in 1912. It is endemic to Tanzania.

The forewings are yellowish white with small spots formed of aggregated black scales beyond the lower angle of the cell below veins 5, 4 and 3. The hindwings are yellowish white with an irroration of large black scales in, beyond and below the end of the cell.

References

Endemic fauna of Tanzania
Moths described in 1912
Moths of Africa
atrisquamalis
Taxa named by George Hampson